In the Goidelic languages, dependent and independent verb forms are distinct verb forms; each tense of each verb exists in both forms. Verbs are often preceded by a particle which marks negation, or a question, or has some other force. The dependent verb forms are used after a particle, while independent forms are used when the verb is not subject to a particle. For example, in Irish, the past tense of the verb  ("to see") has two forms: the independent form  and the dependent form .

Old Irish 
The distinction between dependent and independent forms originates with two distinct but related phenomena in Old Irish: the contrast between absolute and conjunct verb endings, and the contrast between prototonic and deuterotonic forms.

Old Irish verbs that have no prefixes, called "simple verbs", have two sets of endings, absolute and conjunct. The conjunct endings are used after a variety of grammatical particles, including among others the negative particle  ("not"), the interrogative particle , and prepositions combined with the relative pronoun (e.g. "with which"). Where no such "conjunct particle" is present, the absolute endings are used. (An interpunct "·", hyphen "-", or colon ":" is usually used to indicate conjunct forms in pedagogical and analytical works on Old Irish. Actual manuscripts do not use such punctuation marks.) When a particle is present, stress falls on the first syllable of the verb itself, i.e. the syllable after the "·" mark.

In most verbs, distinct absolute and conjunct endings are found in the present indicative, present subjunctive, future, and preterite, and most persons.

Verbs that have one or more prefixes, called "compound verbs", always take conjunct endings. In this case, stress generally falls on the syllable after the first prefix. Where only one prefix is present, that means stress falls on the verb root, but where two or more prefixes are present, stress then falls on the second prefix.

Because these verb forms are stressed on the second syllable, they are called deuterotonic (from Greek  deuteros "second" +  tonos "tone, stress"). As can be seen in the above examples, the phonological effects of stress placement can be significant; for example, when the prefix com- follows the stressed syllable, it is reduced to just n. These phonological changes become even more apparent when a conjunct particle like  ("not") is added. In this case, stress shifts to the first prefix, which has phonological consequences for the rest of the verbal complex.

Because these forms are stressed on the first syllable of the verb proper (i.e. the syllable after the particle), they are called prototonic (Greek  prōtos "first", proto- prefix). The relationship between prototonic and deuterotonic compound verb forms is thus analogous to that between simple verb forms with conjunct and absolute endings: the one group is used after a conjunct particle like , the other group without such a particle.

The distinction between absolute and conjunct endings is believed to have originated with the placement of a particle *(e)s in Proto-Insular Celtic; see Insular Celtic languages#Absolute and dependent verb for discussion.

In addition to the above-mentioned forms, Old Irish also has one dependent verb form that is neither a regular conjunct form nor a prototonic form: the word  functions in many cases as the dependent equivalent of  "is", e.g. "there is no part", where  follows the conjunct particle  "not".

Scottish Gaelic 
Scottish Gaelic retains traces of both the absolute/conjunct distinction and the deuterotonic/prototonic distinction. The absolute/conjunct distinction is retained in the habitual present tense (also used as, and often referred to as, the future tense) of regular and many irregular verbs. In these cases, the independent form of the verb ends in -(a)idh (cf. For example:

In other irregular verbs, the independent/dependent distinction (found in both the habitual present and in the past) is inherited from the Old Irish deuterotonic/prototonic distinction. For example:

Manx 
The situation in Manx is very similar to that in Scottish Gaelic. The future tense has the ending -ee in the independent form, which in many verbs is dropped in the dependent form. In addition, dependent forms undergo various initial mutations in Manx. For example:

In Manx too, remnants of the deuterotonic/prototonic distinction of Old Irish are found in the independent/dependent distinction in some irregular verbs, for example:

Irish 
In Early Modern Irish, the absolute/conjunct distinction was on the wane. It was less thoroughgoing than in Old Irish, but more than in the modern languages. In the conjunct of the present tense, endingless forms like Old Irish  (cf. The distinction was found not only in the 3rd person singular, but also in the 1st and 3rd persons plural. Thus in Early Modern Irish, distinctions like the following were made:

The distinction was also found in the 1st and 3rd persons of the future tense:

In Modern Irish, all of these distinctions have been lost. Sometimes it is the independent form that was generalized (e.g.  "will praise"), sometimes the dependent form (e.g.  "praises").

However, the deuterotonic/prototonic distinction is still found in many irregular verbs, for example:

Irish has two types of relative clause: direct and indirect (see Irish syntax#Relative clauses for details). The distinction between them is shown firstly by the fact that the relative particle  triggers lenition of the following verb in direct relatives but eclipsis of the verb in indirect relatives, and secondly (where the distinction is made) it takes the independent form of the verb in direct relatives and the dependent form in indirect relatives. For example:

 "the work which I was doing" (direct relative; independent form)
 "the man whose son was in the hospital (indirect relative; dependent form)

Irish also has two types of conditional clause, which are introduced by two different words for "if":  introduces realis clauses, and  introduces irrealis clauses. Realis clauses indicate conditionals with a possible fulfillment (e.g. "if he is agreeable", which leaves open the possibility that he is), while irrealis clauses indicate purely hypothetical conditionals (e.g. "if it were a nice day", but it isn't). The realis particle  triggers lenition of the following verb and takes the independent form, while the irrealis particle  triggers eclipsis and takes the dependent form. For example:

 "if she saw it" (realis; independent form)
 "if she had found it" (irrealis; dependent form)

Footnotes

References 

Verb types
Goidelic languages